Ángel de las Heras Díaz (born 19 July 1957 in Toledo) is a Spanish former professional road cyclist. He most notably won the 1983 Vuelta a Burgos.

Major results
1981
 7th Trofeo Masferrer
1982
 1st Stage 5 Vuelta a Burgos
 5th Trofeo Masferrer
1983
 1st  Overall Vuelta a Burgos
1984
 10th Overall Tour of the Basque Country
1985
 2nd Subida a Arrate

Grand Tour general classification results timeline

References

External links

Living people
Spanish male cyclists
1957 births
Sportspeople from Toledo, Spain
Cyclists from Castilla-La Mancha